Emmanuel Besnier (born 18 September 1970) is a French heir and businessman. He is the chief executive officer (CEO) of Lactalis.

Early life
Emmanuel Besnier was born on 18 September 1970 in Laval, Mayenne, France. His father was Michel Besnier and his mother, Christiane. His paternal grandfather, André Besnier, was the founder of Lactalis in 1933. He has a brother, Jean-Michel, and a sister, Marie.

He was educated at the Lycée de l'Immaculée-Conception, a Roman Catholic private lycée in Laval. He graduated from the ISG Business School in Paris.

Career
Besnier joined Lactalis as director of development in 1995. He took over as the CEO in 2000, when his father died.

With his brother and sister, he owned 83% of Lactalis. In June 2018, according to Forbes, he had a net worth of $15.1 billion. He shuns publicity and has been nicknamed "the invisible billionaire".

Lactalis salmonella scandal 
At the end of 2017, Lactasis had to recall 12 million salmonella-contaminated boxes of baby milk from 83 countries. Besnier was summoned by Bruno Lemaire to the French finance ministry.

Philanthropy
He donates Euro 200,000 annually to the Francis-Le-Basser football stadium in Laval. He also attends their board meetings. He built a private box with tinted glass, from which he watches football matches.

In 2006, he was the recipient of the "Mayennais of the Year" award from the local Rotary Club.

Personal life
He married Sandrine, a native of Laval whom he met at the lycée, at the Basilique Notre Dame in Laval. They have three children. They reside in the 7th arrondissement of Paris. They also live in a château in Entrammes near Laval that he inherited from his father.

References 

Living people
1970 births
People from Laval, Mayenne
Businesspeople from Paris
ISG Business School alumni
French billionaires
Emmanuel